Tlmače is a town and municipality in the Levice District in the Nitra Region of Slovakia.

History 
In historical records the town was first mentioned in 1075 as Talmach. It has town status since 1986. From 1986 to 1994 the villages of Malé Kozmálovce and Veľké Kozmálovce were part of the town.

Geography 
It has a population of about 3,500 people.

Demographics 
According to the 2001 census, the town had 4,305 inhabitants. 96.10% of inhabitants were Slovaks, 1.42% Hungarians, 1.02% Czechs and 0.53% Roma. The religious make-up was 72.45% Roman Catholics, 17.44% people with no religious affiliation, and 5.46% Lutherans.

Facilities 
The town has a public library, a cinema, a gym and football stadium. Adding to the facilities, the town has a motocross track.  It has a pharmacy and doctor's surgery and a specialized outpatient facility for adolescents and children. The town has a number of food and general stores and a petrol station.

The town has its own birth registry office and police force. It is also connected by railway.

Sports and cultural events 

Every year the town  in the month of May organizes a Marathon known as TLMAČSKA Dvadsaťpäťka (Tlmače 25). The following event would be now known as TLMAČSKÝ POLMARATÓN (Tlmače Half Marathon). Marathon runners that also includes professionals take active part in this event.

The town has its own football club known as SPARTAK TLMAČE.

Every year in the month of June the town also organizes a theatre festival known as TLMAČSKE ČINOHRANIE. This event is a three-day event in which amateur theatre groups from different cities of Slovakia actively participate.

References

Gallery

External links 
Official website

Cities and towns in Slovakia
Villages and municipalities in Levice District